Librostoma is a subclass of trilobites.

References 

 
Arthropod subclasses
Prehistoric arthropod taxa
Fossil taxa described in 1990